Palomar 1 is a globular cluster part of the Palomar group in the constellation Cepheus in the
halo possibly in the Outer Arm of the Milky Way galaxy. First discovered by George O. Abell in 1954 on the Palomar Survey Sky plates,
it was catalogued as a globular cluster.  At 6.3 to 8 Gyr, it is a very young cluster when compared to the other globular clusters in the Milky Way.
It is a relatively metal-rich globular with [Fe/H] = -0.60.
It is likely that Palomar 1 has a similar evolutionary history to the Sagittarius dwarf companion globular Terzan 7, that is, it may have once been associated
with a dwarf spheroidal galaxy that was later destroyed by tidal forces.

References

External links
 
 SEDS: Palomar 1
 

Cepheus (constellation)
Globular clusters
Astronomical objects discovered in 1954
•